Saturnia mendocino, the Mendocino saturnia moth, is a species of silkmoth in the family Saturniidae. It was first described by Behrens in 1876 and it is found in North America.

The MONA or Hodges number for Saturnia mendocino is 7751.

References

Further reading

 
 
 
 

mendocino
Articles created by Qbugbot
Moths described in 1876